Gavin Whittaker (13 January 1970 – 6 January 2017) was an Australian professional rugby league footballer who played for Canterbury-Bankstown and the Gold Coast.

Background
Whittaker was born on 13th of January, 1970 in Pittsworth town in Queensland district of Australia.

Playing career
Whittaker made his first grade debut for Canterbury in Round 16, 1993 against Balmain.  Whittaker played with the club up until the end of 1995 but was not included in the premiership winning side that defeated Manly.  

Whittaker joined the Gold Coast to play 31 games from 1996 to 1998.

His son, Shai Whittaker later played for representative teams from 2007 to 2013; such as the Gold Coast Titans U18's and Queensland U17's.

Whittaker died from stomach cancer on 6 January 2017 at his home in Parkwood, Queensland, a week before his 47th birthday.

References

External links
 Bulldogs profile

1970 births
2017 deaths
Australian rugby league players
Canterbury-Bankstown Bulldogs players
Gold Coast Chargers players
Rugby league props
Rugby league players from Queensland
Deaths from stomach cancer
Deaths from cancer in Queensland